Patricia Joan Keller McCormick (May 12, 1930 – March 7, 2023) was an American competitive diver who won both diving events at two consecutive Summer Olympics, in 1952 and 1956. She won the James E. Sullivan Award for best amateur athlete in the US in 1956 – the second woman to do so, after Ann Curtis.

As a child in the 1930s and 1940s she was notable for executing dives that were not allowed in competition for female divers (dives reputed to scare most men) and for practicing off the Los Alamitos Bridge in Long Beach, California Harbor. She attended Woodrow Wilson Classical High School, Long Beach City College, and California State University, Long Beach.

After the Olympics McCormick did diving tours and was a model for Catalina swimwear.  She served on the Los Angeles 1984 Summer Olympics organizing committee and began a program called "Pat's Champs"—a foundation to help motivate kids to dream big and to set practical ways to succeed.
McCormick's husband, Glenn, was a diving coach for her, as well as for other Olympic diving medalists. They divorced after 24 years of marriage. He died in 1995.
They had two children, Tim, born in 1956, just five months before McCormick won two gold medals at the Melbourne Olympics, and Kelly (born 1960), who won two Olympic medals (silver, bronze) in diving.
McCormick once appeared on an episode of To Tell the Truth in 1957 (she appeared as an imposter) and on an episode of You Bet Your Life  (#58-28, aired April 2, 1959).

McCormick died in Orange County, California, on March 7, 2023, at the age of 92.

See also
 List of members of the International Swimming Hall of Fame

References

External links

 
 
 
 
 

1930 births
2023 deaths
American female divers
Olympic gold medalists for the United States in diving
Medalists at the 1952 Summer Olympics
Medalists at the 1956 Summer Olympics
Divers at the 1952 Summer Olympics
Divers at the 1956 Summer Olympics
Pan American Games medalists in diving
Pan American Games gold medalists for the United States
Medalists at the 1951 Pan American Games
Medalists at the 1955 Pan American Games
Divers at the 1951 Pan American Games
Divers at the 1955 Pan American Games
James E. Sullivan Award recipients
California State University, Long Beach alumni
Wilson Classical High School alumni
21st-century American women
Sportspeople from Orange County, California
People from Seal Beach, California